Marginella henrikasi is a species of sea snail, a marine gastropod mollusk in the family Marginellidae, the margin snails.

Description

Distribution

References

 Cossignani T. (2006). Marginellidae & Cystiscidae of the World. L'Informatore Piceno. 408pp
 Boyer F. (2014) Etude du complexe Glabella denticulata (Link, 1807). Xenophora Taxonomy 4: 12–29.

Marginellidae
Gastropods described in 1995